Tanvir Ahmed (born 11 February 1963) is a Pakistani former cricketer. He played 50 first-class and 24 List A matches for several domestic teams in Pakistan between 1977 and 1993.

See also
 List of Pakistan Automobiles Corporation cricketers

References

External links
 

1963 births
Living people
Pakistani cricketers
Zarai Taraqiati Bank Limited cricketers
Lahore cricketers
Pakistan Automobiles Corporation cricketers
Cricketers from Lahore